Thuvarankurichi  (also spelled as Tovarankurichchi or Thuvarankurichy) is a town in Tiruchirappalli district in the Chola Nadu region of the Indian state of Tamil Nadu.

The town is located on National Highway 38. It is approximately halfway along the stretch of the highway running between Tiruchirappalli and Madurai, about a  trip away from either city.

The town is located within the drainage basin of the Vellar River. 

Postal index code of Thuvarankurichi is 621314.

ponnampatti panchayat union.

Location on Google Maps
  – Location on Google Maps

Gallery

References 

Cities and towns in Tiruchirappalli district